The Roland MC-307 is a combination of MIDI music sequencer, synthesizer, drum machine and control surface produced by the Roland Corporation. This combination is commonly referred to by Roland as a 'Groovebox'.

It is a scaled-down version of the Roland MC-505. It has the same tone generator, but a much smaller control surface. It does, however, have several features that make it an ideal clock source for musicians wanting to do beatmatching. These include a large, very granular tempo slider similar to the sliders found on a modern phonograph and 'push' and 'hold' buttons that permit temporarily slowing down or speeding up the beat clock.

It can also transmit MIDI Machine Control and MIDI beat clock, and slave to external beat clock sources such as other Roland grooveboxes. It can be used as a sequencer to drive external synthesizer units. It is the successor to the Roland MC-303 and Roland MC-505, and the predecessor to the Roland MC-909 and the Roland MC-808.

Features

The key features of the MC-307 are:

 Sound generator with 64-note polyphony
 8-track sequencer+Tempo/Mute Ctrl Track
 4 assignable CC MIDI knobs
 240 onboard dance music patterns
 MIDI

References

Further reading

External links

MC-307 PDF Manual Links:
Online Roland MC-307 PDF Quick Start Manual Location
Online Roland MC-307 PDF Owners Manual Location
Online Roland MC-307 PDF Addendum Manual Location
Online Roland MC-307 PDF TurboStart Location
Online Roland MC-307 PDF Brochure Location
Roland MC-307 Service Notes Manual Schematics

Other Links:
 Roland UK Corporation, MC-307 site and files.
 Roland US Corporation, MC-307 site and files.
 Harmony Central - 'Leading Internet resource for musicians, supplying valuable information from news and product reviews' - Roland MC-307
 Harmony Central - 'Winter NAMM 2000' - Roland MC-307: Feb 4, 1999

MC-307
Grooveboxes